Danbing (dànbǐng) (Mandarin pronunciation ), also known as egg pancake or rolled egg crepe, is a Taiwanese breakfast dish. Unlike traditional Chinese jianbings or Western pancakes, the dough is made by kneading flour, potato starch, glutinous rice flour, and water into a thin dough, and an omelet is baked on top of the dough. In Taiwan, dan bing is mainly sold at breakfast shops, restaurants as well as night market food stalls. They are also sold commercially in supermarkets, where the dough is frozen in plastic packaging, and egg is added as the dough is heated.

History
Like many other Taiwanese dishes, the original version of the danbing came from mainland China with the Kuomintang after the Chinese civil war ended in 1949. However, gradually over time, the dish has been modified to suit the taste of local Taiwanese people and has since become a unique Taiwanese breakfast dish and an icon of Taiwanese cuisine. One distinctive change made to the original recipe is that sweet potato powder is mixed into the dough to give it a unique texture that makes it more chewy, or Q, as Taiwanese people call it. This became the staple of the Taiwanese danbing, but the different textures were preferred in northern and southern Taiwan. In northern Taiwan, the dough is fried with strong fire, giving it a crispy texture. On the contrary, the soft and chewy texture is emphasized in the south, and the seasoning is slightly sweeter. The dish has recently gained popularity in the United States.

Variations and accompaniments
Variations exist on the basic method of preparation that incorporate other flavors and fillings. Other ingredients, such as tuna chunks and minced pork, are sometimes added with the egg. In Taiwan, the pancakes are often served with soy sauce or sweet chili sauce.

See also
 Taiwanese cuisine
 List of egg dishes
 List of pancakes

References

Flatbread dishes
National dishes
Pancakes
Egg dishes
Street food
Taiwanese cuisine
Breakfast